is a Japanese politician. She has been mayor of Amagasaki since 13 December 2010. She is member of the Greens Japan political party and was its co-president from 2008 to 2010. She was a student at the University of Kobe during the 1995 Great Hanshin earthquake. She was a member of the Hyogo Prefectural Assembly.

References

External links 
 
 Kazumi Inamura's page on the Global Green News website
 Global Greens 2008 - Kazumi Inamura (Japan). YouTube. Uploaded 5 May 2008.

1972 births
Green politicians
Kobe University alumni
Living people
Women mayors of places in Japan
Members of the Hyogo Prefectural Assembly